Helen Verhoeven (born 1974 in Leiden) is a painter and sculptor based in Berlin. 
Verhoeven was born in the Netherlands and moved to the U.S. in 1986. She attended the San Francisco Art Institute, New York Academy of Art, and the Rijksakademie van Beeldende Kunsten in Amsterdam. In 2008 she won the Dutch Royal Award for Modern Painting, in 2010 the Wolvecamp Painting Award, and in 2019 she was the recipient of the ABN-AMRO Art Prize.  She was commissioned to make a painting for the new courthouse of Dutch Supreme Court in The Hague that opened in 2015. Verhoeven's works seem to explore the theme of ceremonial gatherings. She makes monumental-sized paintings that are populated with contorted figures in various states of rapture, despair, lust and estrangement. She is the daughter film director Paul Verhoeven.

References

External sources

Rosenberg, Karen. (October 31, 2008). Art in Review. New York Times
Hamilton, Adrian. (November 25, 2013). A Mixed Body of Work. The Independent (London)

1974 births
Living people
Dutch painters
Artists from Leiden
20th-century Dutch women artists
21st-century Dutch women artists